Bulimulus eschariferus is a species of tropical air-breathing land snail, a pulmonate gastropod mollusk in the subfamily Bulimulinae.

This species is endemic to Ecuador.  Its natural habitats are subtropical or tropical dry shrubland and subtropical or tropical dry lowland grassland. It is threatened by habitat loss.

References

Bulimulus
Gastropods described in 1887
Taxa named by César Marie Félix Ancey
Taxonomy articles created by Polbot